PyEphem is a library that implements astronomical algorithms for the Python programming language. It is free under the LGPL.

The library is written in Python and C, with code for calculating positions of bodies taken from XEphem by permission.

References

External links
 Official homepage

Cross-platform software
Free astronomy software
Free science software
Free software programmed in Python
Python (programming language) libraries